Zygmunt Kamiński (22 November 1888 – 12 October 1969) was a Polish painter and professor at the Warsaw University of Technology. His work was part of the painting event in the art competition at the 1928 Summer Olympics. He also designed the modern Coat of arms of Poland.

References

1888 births
1969 deaths
20th-century Polish painters
20th-century Polish male artists
Olympic competitors in art competitions
Artists from Warsaw
Academic staff of the Warsaw University of Technology
Polish male painters